Feng Shuo (born 15 January 1998) is a female Chinese professional tennis player.

Career
Feng has a career-high WTA singles ranking of 547, achieved on 1 April 2019. She also has a career-high doubles ranking of world No. 207, reached on 7 October 2019. Feng has won seven doubles titles on the ITF Circuit.

She made her WTA Tour main-draw debut at the 2018 Guangzhou International Women's Open, partnering Kang Jiaqi.

ITF Circuit finals

Doubles: 11 (7 titles, 4 runner-ups)

References

External links
 
 

1998 births
Living people
Chinese female tennis players
21st-century Chinese women